The  is a Japanese railway line connecting Oyama in Tochigi Prefecture with Maebashi in Gunma Prefecture.  long, the line is owned and operated by the East Japan Railway Company (JR East). The name refers to the fact that Gunma and Tochigi prefectures were once part of an ancient province called , which was later split into Kōzuke (Gunma) and Shimotsuke (Tochigi). This line connects both halves of the old province.

Services
Local trains run about once in an hour during the day between Oyama and Maebashi and twice or three times as frequently between Maebashi and Takasaki. Some rapid services from Ueno and the Shōnan-Shinjuku Line travel through onto the Ryōmō Line, but they stop at every station.

Station list

Rolling stock

Present
Takasaki to Oyama
 211-3000 series 4- and 6-car EMUs (since August 2016)

Takasaki to Maebashi (Takasaki Line through services)
 E231-1000 series
 E233-3000 series (since 1 September 2012)

Ashikaga Ō-Fuji-Matsuri special services
 185 series (since 2005)
 E257 series (since 2005)
 485 series (since 2006)

Former
 107 series (until October 2017)
 115-1000 series 4-car EMUs (until March 2018)
 185 series (Akagi limited express services until March 2016)
 651 series (Akagi limited express services until 12 March 2021 and Ashikaga Ō-Fuji-Matsuri special services)
 E653 series (Ashikaga Ō-Fuji-Matsuri special services in 2013 and 2014)

History
The Oyama to Kiryu section was opened in 1888 by the Ryomo Railway, and extended to Shin-Maebashi the following year. The company merged with the Nippon Railway in 1897, and that company was nationalised in 1906.

References

External links

 Stations of the Ryōmō Line (JR East) 

 
Lines of East Japan Railway Company
Rail transport in Tochigi Prefecture
Rail transport in Gunma Prefecture
1067 mm gauge railways in Japan
Railway lines opened in 1889